Eupithecia karakasykensis is a moth in the family Geometridae. It was described from the upper part of Kok-Suu-Western River gorge.

References

Moths described in 1988
karakasykensis
Moths of Asia